Massimo Fenati (born: Genoa, Italy, 1969), is an Italian comic book artist, illustrator and animator. He lives in London, UK, and is a dual citizen of Italy and the UK. He's mostly known as the creator of the Gus & Waldo book series and animations, about a pair of gay penguins in love. His books have been translated and published in several countries, among which his native Italy, where he also works regularly for Corriere della Sera newspaper.

After obtaining an MA in architecture at the University of Genoa in 1994, Fenati moved to London in 1995 to work as a product designer in the studio of Jasper Morrison. He then moved to two more design practices (Pentagram and David Chipperfield Architects) before setting up his own studio in 2003. After a few years of work in the furniture and product design industry for clients such as Innermost, Livingetc, Crabtree & Evelyn and Isos Collection, his career as a cartoonist started in 2006 in when his first Gus & Waldo book (Gus & Waldo's Book Of Love) was published by Orion Books in the United Kingdom.
The success of the first book led to three more volumes in the Gus & Waldo series (Gus & Waldo's Book Of Fame, 2007 and Gus & Waldo's Book Of Sex, 2008; these were later republished together in the compendium Gus & Waldo Crazy In Love, 2010; and the latest volume is "Arte Pinguina") and to publications in a number of foreign territories: Brazil, Germany, Finland and Italy among others. With the animation based on the Gus & Waldo books, he has won the audience awards at the IRIS Animation Film Festival in Rio de Janeiro, the Queersicht Film Festival in Berne and the Sub-Ti competition for short films at the 2009 Venice Film Festival.

In 2011 Fenati published 101 Uses For A Dead Meerkat (Boxtree Ltd.), a book of cartoons, which was later translated a published also in Italy with Arnoldo Mondadori Editore in 2013.

Fenati also collaborates with British TV production companies such as Tiger Aspect Productions, Endemol and Maverick, and produces motion graphics for programmes for BBC, Channel 4, and Sky, such as Embarrassing Bodies, Stephen Fry Gadget Man, Dispatches and Ripper Street.

In 2012 and 2013 he collaborated with Il Fatto Quotidiano newspaper and published a comic for children titled Cico & Toto on the Monday edition of the paper.
He created the image and logo for the 2011 edition of the TGLFF (Torino Gay and Lesbian Film Festival), and in 2013 he was appointed as curator of the new animation section at the same festival.

Since 2014 he collaborates with Corriere della Sera newspaper, regularly posting a comic strip about food on the paper's website, titled "La Cucina A Fumetti" (The Cartoon Cuisine).

His latest book is the graphic novel "La Mennulara" ("The Almond Picker"), published by Feltrinelli Comics in 2018 and based on the eponymous best-seller by Simonetta Agnello Hornby.

Bibliography

References

Websites 
Main website:
 http://www.massimofenati.com

Character-specific websites:
 http://www.gusandwaldo.com
 http://www.deadmeerkats.com
 

1969 births
Living people
British comics artists
Italian comics artists
British cartoonists
Italian cartoonists
Italian comics writers
British comics writers
British comic strip cartoonists
Artists from Genoa
University of Genoa alumni
21st-century Italian male artists
21st-century Italian male writers
21st-century British male writers
21st-century British male artists
Naturalised citizens of the United Kingdom